{{Speciesbox
| image = 
| image_caption = 
| genus = Phanera
| species = cardinalis
| authority = (Pierre ex Gagnep.) Sinou & Bruneau
| synonyms = Homotypic:
 Bauhinia cardinalis Pierre ex Gagnep., 1912
 Lasiobema cardinale (Pierre ex Gagnep.) de Wit, 1956
Heterotypic:
 Bauhinia dolichobotrys Merr., 1938
 Lasiobema dolichobotrys (Merr.) A.Schmitz, 1973
}}Phanera cardinalis is a species of lianas in the subfamily Cercidoideae and the tribe Bauhinieae, the genus having been separated from Bauhinia and also placed in the defunct genus Lasiobema.  Under its synonym, Bauhinia cardinalis, records exist from Vietnam, where it is called móng bò đỏ, mấu hang or mấu tràm''; no subspecies were listed in the Catalogue of Life.

References

External links

Cercidoideae
Flora of Vietnam
Fabales of Asia